The total length of the Saudi Arabian coastline is  with two coastlines: a long west coast on the Red Sea and a shorter east coast on the Persian Gulf.

, active lighthouses in Saudi Arabia are maintained by the Saudi Ports Authority. There are about 633 navigational aids, of which 72% are solar-powered.

The lighthouses of Saudi Arabia are listed in the National Geospatial-Intelligence Agency List of Lights publication 112. They are listed by the United Kingdom Hydrographic Office on volume E of the Admiralty List of Lights & Fog Signals. They are also listed on The Lighthouse Directory and on the ARLHS World List of Lights.

This list is based on The Lighthouse Directory.

Red Sea lighthouses
 Jeddah Light - Jeddah 
 Jizan Light - Jizan 
 South Mazarkiff Light - Farasan Islands

Persian Gulf lighthouses
 Ra's Rakan Light - south of the King Fahd Causeway  
 Najwah Shoal Light - north end of a shoal off the entrance to Dammam  

See also
 Lists of lighthouses and lightvessels

References

External links

 

Saudi Arabia
 
Lighthouses
Lighthouses